Bùi Diễm (1 October 1923 – 24 October 2021) was South Vietnam's ambassador to the United States under President Nguyễn Văn Thiệu. He played a key role in the last desperate attempt to secure US$722 million in military aid to defend South Vietnam against the North in 1975. He was the nephew of Trần Trọng Kim, who served as the Prime Minister of Emperor Bảo Đại.

Bùi was born in Hà Nam on 1 October 1923. He was the founder of the Saigon Post, in South Vietnam. After the fall of Saigon in 1975, he settled in the United States, living in Rockville, Maryland. He was a scholar at the Woodrow Wilson International Center for Scholars and at the American Enterprise Institute, as well as a research professor at George Mason University. Bui Diem was interviewed by Stanley Karnow  for Vietnam: A Television History, where he recounts in a stunning allegation that Lyndon B. Johnson had unilaterally deployed  Marine ground troops into South Vietnam without consulting the South Vietnamese government.

He was the author of the book In the Jaws of History. He was interviewed in Ken Burns's series The Vietnam War.

Bùi died in Rockville, Maryland, on 24 October 2021, at the age of 98.

References

External links
Interview with Bui Diem
The Vietnamese Economy and Its Transformation to an Open Market System 

1923 births
2021 deaths
Vietnamese emigrants to the United States
George Mason University faculty
People of the First Indochina War
Vietnamese exiles
Ambassadors of South Vietnam to the United States
American Enterprise Institute
People from Hà Nam Province